HMS LST-362 was a  in the Royal Navy during World War II.

Construction and career 
LST-362 was laid down on 10 August 1942 by Bethlehem Steel Company, Quincy, Massachusetts. Launched on 10 October 1942 and commissioned into the Royal Navy on 16 November 1942.

During World War II, LST-362 was assigned to the Europe-Africa-Middle theater. She took part in the Sicilian occupation in Italy from 9 to 15 July 1943 and 28 July to 17 August 1943. Then the Salerno landings from 9 to 21 September of the same year. 

On 22 January 1944, she took part in the Anzio invasion. While returning from the Mediterranean to the United Kingdom with the convoy MKS-40 in Biscay Bay area on 2 March later that year, she was struck by a torpedo fired by the German submarine U-744 on her starboard side. She was the only ship sunk in her convoy. 

She was struck from the Navy Register on 28 April 1945.

Citations

Sources 
 
 
 
 

 

World War II amphibious warfare vessels of the United Kingdom
Ships built in Quincy, Massachusetts
1942 ships
LST-1-class tank landing ships of the Royal Navy
Ships sunk by German submarines in World War II